Platyceps bholanathi, also known as the Nagarjun Sagar racer, Nagarjunasagar racer, Nagarjuna  racer, Bhola Nath's racer, or Sharma's racer, is a species of colubrid snake. It is found in peninsular India, in the Eastern Ghats and the Deccan Plateau, in the states of Andhra Pradesh, Karnataka, Tamil Nadu, and Telangana. It is a rather recently described species, that was first discovered in 1976, in the Nagarjuna Sagar Dam by scientists of the Zoological Survey of India.

It is a diurnal, fast-moving, active snake, living among rock boulders. It feeds on lizards, small mammals, and birds.

Description
A slender snake; rich brown above with white, black-edged rounded or ovoid spots on the back; underside white.

Scales: Supralabials 9; loreal 1, preocular 1-2, postocular 2, subpostocular 1 or absent, temporal 2+2 or 2+3; 19 mid body rows; ventral 201-212, anal divided; subcaudal 105-121, paired.

Distribution
This species is known from Nagarjuna Sagar Dam in Telangana, Tirupati in Andhra Pradesh, Bellary in Karnataka and Gingee and Hosur in Tamil Nadu, essentially covering all of the rocky hillocks and outcrops in south India.

References

 Guptha, Bubesh; Nimmakayala Venkata Sivaram Prasad, Deepak Veerappan. 2012. Rediscovery and range extension of Coluber bholanathi Sharma, 1976 from Seshachalam hills, Andhra Pradesh, India. Herpetology Notes 6: 447–448.
Ganesh S. R., Adimallaiah D., Kailash P. K. (2013) New locality records of Nagarjun Sagar Racer Snake, Coluber bholanathi Sharma, 1976. Herpetotropicos. 9 (1-2): 09–12.
 Seetharamaraju, M. & C. Srinivasulu 2013. Discovery and description of male specimen of Coluber bholanathi Sharma, 1976 (Reptilia: Colubridae) from Hyderabad, India. Taprobanica 5 (1): 32–35.
 Sharma, R. C. 1976. Some observations on ecology and systematics of Coluber bholanati, a new species of snake from India. Comp. Physiol. Ecol. 1 (3): 105–107.
 Sharma, R. C. 2004. Handbook Indian Snakes. Akhil Books, New Delhi, 292 pp.
 Sharma, Vivek; Jose Louies, Aditya Vattam 2013. A Contribution to Coluber bholanathi Sharma, 1976 (Serpentes: Colubridae). Russ. J. Herpetol. 20 (4): 259–263.
 Smart, Utpal; Eric N. Smith, B.H.C.K. Murthy & Arun Mohanty 2014. Report of Nagarjunasagar Racer Coluber bholanathi Sharma, 1976 (Squamata: Serpentes: Colubridae) from the Gingee Hills, Tamil Nadu, India. JoTT 6 (4): 5671–5674.

bholanathi
Snakes of Asia
Reptiles of India
Endemic fauna of India
Reptiles described in 1976